Athletes from the Islamic Republic of Iran competed at the 1992 Summer Paralympics in Barcelona, Spain.

Competitors

Medal summary

Medal table

Medalists

Results by event

Athletics

Men

Table tennis

Women

Volleyball

Men's sitting

References
International Paralympic Committee

Nations at the 1992 Summer Paralympics
1992
Paralympics